(There is something defiant and fainthearted),
 176, is a church cantata by Johann Sebastian Bach. He composed it in  Leipzig for Trinity Sunday on a text by Christiana Mariana von Ziegler and first performed it on 27 May 1725, concluding his second year of cantata compositions in Leipzig.

History and words 
Bach composed the cantata during his second year in Leipzig for Trinity. The prescribed readings for the Sunday were from the Epistle to the Romans, reflecting "depth of wisdom", and from the Gospel of John, the meeting of Jesus and Nicodemus.

In his second year in Leipzig, Bach composed chorale cantatas between the first Sunday after Trinity Sunday and Palm Sunday, but for Easter returned to cantatas on more varied texts, possibly because he lost his librettist. Nine of his cantatas for the period between Easter and Pentecost are based on texts of Christiana Mariana von Ziegler, including this cantata. He later inserted most of them, including this one, in his third annual cantata cycle.

Ziegler took the idea from the Gospel that Nicodemus came to speak with Jesus at night, possibly afraid to be seen with him, and deducted thoughts about the timidity of Christians in general. She opened her text with a paraphrase from Jeremiah, describing the heart of man as "", the conflicting attributes rendered for example as "daring and shy" or "contrary and despairing". Literally "trotzig" means "defiant", "verzagt" means "despondent". The poet continued with a paraphase of Nicodemus' words that nobody could act as Jesus if God was not with him. She used the eighth stanza of Paul Gerhardt's hymn "" (1653) as a closing chorale, sung to the same melody as "".

Bach first performed the cantata on 27 May 1725. It was the conclusion of Bach's second year of cantata compositions in Leipzig.

Scoring and structure 
The cantata is scored for three vocal soloists (soprano, alto, and bass), a four-part choir, two oboes, oboe da caccia, two violins, viola, and basso continuo. The work has six movements, as follows:

 Chorus: 
 Recitative (alto): 
 Aria (soprano): 
 Recitative (bass): 
 Aria (alto): 
 Chorale:

Music 
The opening chorus in C minor concentrates, without instrumental introduction, on a choral fugue. A complex theme illustrates both contrasting aspects that Jeremiah mentioned of the human heart, rendering "" (defiant) twice, once in a repeated high note reached by a triad fanfare, then in an upward run with a surprising modulation, whereas "" (timid) appears as a sighing motif in chromatism. The strings accompany "" marked forte, "" piano, while the oboes double the voices. Klaus Hofmann notes: "Bach has taken greater pleasure in depicting defiance than in representing timidity (and has thus departed to some extent from his librettist's intention). John Eliot Gardiner translates the text as "There is something stubborn (or defiant or wilful) and fainthearted (or disheartened or despairing) about the human heart", describes the movement as a "dramatic antithesis between headstrong aggression and lily-livered frailty", and wonders "whether this arresting comment on the human condition reflected Bach's own views".

The soprano aria "" (Your dear bright light)
 is in contrast a "light-footed" gavotte, sometimes without continuo.

In the following recitative, Nicodemus speaks for the Christian. Bach added a quotation from the Gospel to Ziegler's printed text, "for whosoever believes in Thee, shall not perish" and stressed it by setting it as an arioso.

In the alto aria, an unusual obbligato of three oboes in unison, including one oboe da caccia, alludes to the Trinity that is celebrated.

The closing chorale is a four-part setting of the archaic modal melody of "". At the very end Bach adds two measures at a higher pitch on the words "" (one Being, three persons), reflecting the Trinity and a "remoteness of God from his relationship to humankind". Gardiner concludes that Bach "signs off his second Leipzig cycle with this cantata crammed with provocative thoughts and musical exegesis.

Recordings 

 The RIAS Bach Cantatas Project (1949–1952), Karl Ristenpart, RIAS-Kammerchor, RIAS-Kammerorchester, Gerda Lammers, Lotte Wolf-Matthäus, Gerhard Niese, Audite 1950
 Die Bach Kantate Vol. 39, Helmuth Rilling, Gächinger Kantorei, Bach-Collegium Stuttgart, Inga Nielsen, Carolyn Watkinson, Walter Heldwein, Hänssler 1980
 J. S. Bach: Das Kantatenwerk · Complete Cantatas · Les Cantates, Folge / Vol. 41 – BWV 175–179, Gustav Leonhardt, Knabenchor Hannover, Collegium Vocale Gent, Leonhardt-Consort, soloist of the Knabenchor Hannover, Paul Esswood, Max van Egmond, Telefunken 1988
 Bach Edition Vol. 15 – Cantatas Vol. 8, Pieter Jan Leusink, Holland Boys Choir, Netherlands Bach Collegium, Ruth Holton, Sytse Buwalda, Bas Ramselaar, Brilliant Classics 2000
 Bach Cantatas Vol. 27: Blythburgh/Kirkwell / For Whit Tuesday / For Trinity Sunday, John Eliot Gardiner, Monteverdi Choir, English Baroque Soloists, Ruth Holton, Daniel Taylor, Peter Harvey, Soli Deo Gloria 2000
 J. S. Bach: Complete Cantatas Vol. 15, Ton Koopman, Amsterdam Baroque Orchestra & Choir, Johannette Zomer, Bogna Bartosz, Klaus Mertens, Antoine Marchand 2001
 J. S. Bach: Cantatas Vol. 35 (Cantatas from Leipzig 1725) – BWV 74, 87, 128, 176, Masaaki Suzuki, Bach Collegium Japan, Yukari Nonoshita, Robin Blaze, Peter Kooy, BIS 2007

References

Sources 
 
 
 Es ist ein trotzig und verzagt Ding BWV 176; BC A 92 / Sacred cantata (Trinity Sunday) Bach Digital
 Cantata BWV 176 Es ist ein trotzig und verzagt Ding history, scoring, sources for text and music, translations to various languages, discography, discussion, Bach Cantatas Website
 BWV 176 Es ist ein trotzig und verzagt Ding English translation, University of Vermont
 BWV 176 Es ist ein trotzig und verzagt Ding text, scoring, University of Alberta
 Luke Dahn: BWV 176.6 bach-chorales.com

Church cantatas by Johann Sebastian Bach
1725 compositions